Orlando Christian Prep was founded in 1960, and is currently a ministry of Orlando Baptist Church.  Considered one of the most established Christian schools in the greater Orlando area, OCP serves over 600 students from various backgrounds. The school is separated into four academic divisions including Pre-K (K2-K4), Elementary (K5-5th), Middle School (6th-8th), and High School (9th-12th).

History 
Orlando Christian Prep was founded in 1960 as Orange Christian School a ministry of Temple Baptist Church

External links

Baptist schools in the United States
Christian schools in Florida
Schools in Orlando, Florida
Educational institutions established in 1960
Private high schools in Florida
Private middle schools in Florida
Private elementary schools in Florida